Hatfield Meats is primarily a pork meat packing company based in Hatfield, Pennsylvania. It produces over 1,200 different fresh and manufactured pork products. Hatfield's distribution is primarily on the East Coast of the United States, as well as some international markets. Their hot dogs are sold at Philadelphia Phillies and Washington Nationals baseball home games.

Products
The company is a manufacturer and supplier of over 1,200 fresh and manufactured pork products. These include a variety of pork-based foods such as: bacon,  ham, hot dogs, sausage, pork tenderloin, pork roasts, deli meat, scrapple,and pork rolls.

Company history
John C. Clemens started Pleasant Valley Packing, which sold meat from his farm in Mainland, Pennsylvania, primarily to markets in Philadelphia, Pennsylvania. J. M. Funk started Hatfield in 1895 as a pork processing plant in Hatfield, Pennsylvania. John S. and Abe Clemens, two of John C.'s sons, ran Pleasant Valley Packing until it burned down in 1946. The two Clemens brothers then purchased the Hatfield plant with their brothers, Ezra and Lester. The company has been owned and controlled by the Clemens family ever since through the private Clemens Family Corporation, which operates primarily through the Clemens Food Group. The Hatfield manufacturing operation remains non-union.

The current president is Douglas Clemens. The current CEO and Chairman of the Board is Philip Clemens.

References

External links
Hatfield Meats

Companies based in Montgomery County, Pennsylvania
Brand name hot dogs
Brand name meats
Sausage companies of the United States
Manufacturing companies based in Pennsylvania
American companies established in 1895
Food and drink companies established in 1895
1895 establishments in Pennsylvania